Bawomataluo village is a settlement in the Teluk Dalam province of the South Nias Regency of Indonesia. The village is built on a flat-topped hill, the name Bawomataluo meaning "Sun Hill", and is one of the best-preserved villages built in traditional style. The largest house is that of the chief and is believed to date back to the eighteenth century. Large stone slabs stand in front of the houses and an open space in the centre of the village is used for traditional ceremonies and rituals.

In view of the original traditional architectural features of the settlement and its environment representing the megalithic monuments tradition, the site was included on Indonesia's national Tentative List for nomination as a World Heritage Site under Criteria (i), (iv), and (vi) in 2009.

Location
The hill is oriented in the southeast to the northwest direction. The settlement is planned to fit the topography of the land and a spring provides adequate supplies of water. It is surrounded by "valleys and deep gorges".

History
According to the family history traced to the 18th century settlement at Bawomataluo, the design of houses is credited to King Laowo who established the Kingdom in the region whose antecedence was to the Gomo family. The houses were built by Saonigeho (Siliwu Gere) who belonged to the same Laowo family. As of 2009, the fourth line of descendants of the Laowo family are residing in the settlement.

Features
The settlement is built around the megalithic monuments positioned in vertical and horizontal directions. These are locally called the daro-daro and the naitaro respectively. Daro-daro represents males and naitaro represents females. The funerary site where the stones are found is on a terraced land which is approached by climbing 7 stone steps in the first stage and 70 steps at the second stage (a total of 80 steps is also mentioned). Also located here is a stone feature in the open area which is part of the customary rituals.

This house is said to be the "oldest and largest on Nias". The house is built with large sized wooden beams in the interior. There is a drum in the house which is used to signal the start and end of meetings. Another notable feature in the house is of carvings in wood and an array of jaw bones of pigs. A large stone throne at the entry to the house is used by the Chief; by its side there is a depiction of a phallus carved out of stone. Outside the Chief's house there are stone tables where dead bodies used to be kept to rot.

New houses have also been built in between the traditional houses which also face each other, and are in a straight line aligned in the northwest to the northeast direction. In addition, there are houses built at the center of the settlement which are in a row oriented towards the southeast. The entire complex consists of 500 houses, each with a household head, housing a population of 7,000. Apart from the size of the houses (omo hada) and a feature at its entrance to denote the status of the family, each house has a symbolic representation of the status of the head of the family. Houses are made of carved wood and reflects the skill of the local people in wood crafting.

However, in the present practice the sharp-edged sticks are removed for ceremonial jumping. This jumping is also performed for financial considerations outside of ceremonial events. The cultural activity at the settlement is in the form of war dances by young men.

References

Bibliography

Archaeological sites in Indonesia
World Heritage Sites in Indonesia
Prehistoric Indonesia